Lahoussine Ali (born 16 August 1974) is a Moroccan fencer. At the 2012 Summer Olympics he competed in the Men's foil, but was defeated in the first round.

References

External links

Moroccan male foil fencers
Living people
Olympic fencers of Morocco
Fencers at the 2012 Summer Olympics
1974 births
21st-century Moroccan people